Menabrea may refer to:

Luigi Federico Menabrea, 19th century Italian Prime Minister, general, and mathematician
Birra Menabrea, an Italian brewing company
27988 Menabrea, a minor planet